Gerhard Fischer (born 1945) is a German-born computer scientist, Professor of Computer Science, a Fellow of the Institute of Cognitive Science, and the founder and director of the Center for LifeLong Learning & Design (L3D) at the University of Colorado, Boulder.

Academic
In 1971 he graduated with a Masters (Mathematics and Physical Education) from the University of Heidelberg. With a fellowship from the German Academic Exchange Service (DAAD), he spent the following two years at the University of British Columbia, Vancouver, and the University of California, Irvine. He obtained a PhD from the University of Hamburg in Computer Science (1977), followed by a postdoctoral fellowship at MIT, Cambridge, (working with Seymour Papert and the LOGO community) and Xerox Parc (working with Alan Kay and the Smalltalk community).

From 1978 to 1984 he served as an Assistant and Associate Professor at the University of Stuttgart. During these six years, he spent several extended visits at Carnegie Mellon University, Pittsburgh to study with Herbert A. Simon who served as the primary advisor for his "Habilitation" degree that he obtained in 1983 from the University of Stuttgart.
In 1984 he accepted a position in the Computer Science Department of the University of Colorado, Boulder combined with being a Fellow of the Institute of Cognitive Science. During the years at CU Boulder, he was Stiftungsprofessor at the Department of Computer Science of the Technische Universität Darmstadt, Germany (1994-1995) and Erskine fellow at the University of Canterbury, Christchurch, New Zealand (2002-2003).

He was awarded a "Chair of Excellence" at the Charles III University of Madrid (UC3M), Spain and he spent 6 months in 2012 and 2013 as a visiting professor at UC3M. He obtained two fellowships from the Hanse-Wissenschaftskolleg (HWK) an Advanced Study Institute in Delmenhorst, Germany and he twice spent 6 months—in 2014/2015 and 2021/2022—at the HWK as a fellow. He was invited as a Visiting Professor to the Technical University, Vienna, Austria (October 2018) and the University of Hiroshima, Japan (April 2019).

Research

Early Work (1978-1984) 
In his early work at the University of Stuttgart, he explored theoretical frameworks and system developments for Human-Computer Interaction and co-founded conferences in Germany on "Mensch-Maschine Kommunikation" (1980) and "Software Ergonomics" (1983).

Work at CU Boulder (1984 – 2012) 
His early work at CU Boulder was centered on domain-oriented design environments, critiquing systems, and the exploration of high-functionality environments.

In 1994, the Center for LifeLong Learning & Design was founded and in the following years, he (in close collaboration with numerous colleagues, including specifically Ernesto Arias, Hal Eden, Michael Eisenberg, and Walter Kintsch and a large number of PhD students) explored themes in meta-design, social creativity, cultures of participation, computer-supported collaborative learning,  support environments for people with cognitive disabilities, and collaborative problem solving and decision making with table-top computing environments. 
He participated in the development of numerous NSF research programs (including: Lifelong Learning, Science of Design, Creativity and IT). He served as the principal advisor of 20 PhD students

Recent Work (2013 – 2023) 
His research activities are centered around:
 supporting collaborative problem solving and decision making with table-top computing environments.
 identifying design trade-offs associated with wicked problems and exploring quality of life as a fundamental objective of human-centered design
 rethinking and reinventing learning, education, and collaboration in the digital age
He is currently serving on numerous advisory and editorial boards—including: (1) Bonn-Aachen International Center for Information Technology (b-it)	; (2) Munich Center of the Learning Sciences, LMU Munich; (3) Wirtschaftsinformatik und Neue Medien, University of Siegen; (4) GRADE PhD School, University of Gothenburg, Sweden

Awards
He was 
 inducted into the ACM SIGCHI Academy in 2007 for playing a crucial role as an integrator of and mediator between HCI and a spectrum of related fields;
 elected as a Fellow of the Association for Computing Machinery (ACM) in 2009, for contributions to human computer interaction and computer-mediated lifelong learning. 
 recipient of the RIGO award from the ACM Special Interest Group on Design of Communication (SIGDOC). 
 featured as one of the Pioneers of HCI
In 2015, he received an Honorary Doctorate from the University of Gothenburg, Sweden

References

External links
 
 Gerhard Fischer's Publications

Living people
German computer scientists
American computer scientists
University of Hamburg alumni
Heidelberg University alumni
University of Colorado Boulder faculty
Fellows of the Association for Computing Machinery
1945 births
Academic staff of Technische Universität Darmstadt